This chronological list of managers of Aston Villa Football Club comprises all those who have held the position of secretary or manager of the first team of Aston Villa since the formation of the club in 1874. From 1874 to 1934, the team was selected by a committee whose secretary had the same powers and role as a manager has today. There were two secretaries during this period, George Ramsay and W. J. Smith. The most successful person to manage the club was George Ramsay, who won six FA Cups and six First Division championships in his 42-year reign as secretary. Jimmy McMullan became the first full-time manager in 1934. Aston Villa were the first top-tier club to appoint a manager from outside the United Kingdom or Ireland when Jozef Vengloš was appointed in 1990.

Manager turnover has increased substantially over the past 30 years. The chairman of the time, Doug Ellis, acquired the nickname "Deadly Doug" because of his penchant for hiring and firing managers. In the 37 years that Ellis was involved with the Board, he hired and fired 13 out of the 24 managers that Aston Villa have had over their 133-year history. One of Ellis's last acts before selling the club to Randy Lerner was to appoint Martin O'Neill, who was with the club from 4 August 2006 to 9 August 2010.

Managers
This list does not include caretaker managers or those who managed in a temporary capacity.

Information correct as of 21 January 2023. Only competitive matches are counted.

Notes

References
General
 
 
 

Specific

External links
 Aston Villa's official website

 
Managers
Aston Villa